Numb is the third studio album from the Italian nu metal band Linea 77.

Track listing 
 "Venus" - 3:53
 "Insane Lovers" - 3:32
 "Fantasma" (Ghost) - 3:39
 "Warhol" (feat. Aretuska's BrasSicilian) - 3:38
 "Ants" - 3:13
 "66 (diabolus in musica)" (feat. Subsonica) - 4:26
 "Third Moon" - 4:25
 "I Fall Asleep" - 3:36
 "Houdini" - 3:32
 "New World Soccer" - 4:06
 "Alienation Is the New Form of Zen" - 5:14

Charts

References

2003 albums
Linea 77 albums
Italian-language albums
Earache Records albums